Rauno Pehka (born January 1, 1969) is a retired Estonian professional basketball player who played mostly at the point guard position.

He won the Soviet Union league championship in 1991 as a member of the Tallinn Kalev basketball team. Pehka mostly played in Estonia. After retiring Rauno Pehka has been working as a national teams' youth coach.

International career
Besides competing in the highest level of Estonian basketball, Rauno Pehka has played in Belgium for BC Oostende, in Israel for Ironi Ramat Gan and in Latvia for Rīgas ASK. With Estonian national team he competed in two EuroBasket competitions: EuroBasket 1993, EuroBasket 2001. In 2008–2009 he was assistant coach of the Estonia national basketball team.

References

External links
 Profile at basket.ee

Books
 

1969 births
Living people
ASK Riga players
Estonian men's basketball players
Estonian expatriate basketball people in Belgium
Estonian expatriate basketball people in Israel
Estonian expatriate basketball people in Latvia
Point guards
BC Tallinn Kalev players
People from Keila
KK Kalev players
Estonian basketball coaches